Parattai Engira Azhagu Sundaram is a 2007 Indian Tamil-language crime action film directed by Suresh Krissna. It stars Dhanush, Meera Jasmine and Archana. The film is a remake of 2005 Kannada blockbuster film Jogi. The film revolves around a woman who comes to the city from her village in search of her presumably lost son. The film was released on 27 April 2007 and it couldn't repeat the success of its original version and was declared a box office bomb.

Plot 

Azhagu Sundaram (Dhanush) is a village bumpkin who comes from Tirunelveli to Chennai to earn money to buy gold bangles for his beloved mother Meenakshi (Archana). He gets entangled in the big bad world of dons and goondas and is unable to get back home to see his mother. On the other hand, Meenakshi lands up in Chennai in search of her son without even knowing his address or whereabouts. Meenakshi bumps into Shwetha (Meera Jasmine), a journalism student who takes pity on her, takes her home, and promises to help her find her son. Azhagu is now known as Parattai in Chennai and is taken under the wings of Khader Bhai (Nassar), a tea shop owner. Parattai is forced to take the aruval as gang wars erupt and single-handedly he wipes out Deva (Adithya), Kesavan (Kadhal Dhandapani) and Suri (Aryan), all dreaded criminals in the city. On parallel lines, he never sees his mother and finally accompanies her dead body to the crematorium, thinking it is an orphan's corpse. He dances with others, offers flowers, and finally after her body is charred, he realizes that it was his mother.

Cast 

Dhanush as Azhagu Sundaram (Parattai)
Meera Jasmine as Shwetha
Archana as Meenakshi
Nassar as Khader Bhai
Santhanam as Sannasi
Livingston as Azhagu Sundaram's father
Adithya as Deva
Kadhal Dhandapani as Kesavan
Aryan as Suri
Vidharth as Parattai's friend
Kadhal Arun Kumar as Chitti
Monisha Ravishankar as Shwetha's friend
Ajay Rathnam
Crane Manohar
Manobala
K. Natraj
Riyaz Khan
Mumaith Khan as item number ('Nee Rasthali')

Production 
Rajinikanth, who had watched the preview show of Kannada film Jogi, expressed his interest to remake the film in Tamil with his son-in-law, actor Dhanush. The film director Keyaar bought the remake rights of this film. Prem, the director of the original, was approached to direct the remake, but declined as he did not want to pander to the lead actor's "larger-than-life stature" at the cost of realism. Choreographer Raju Sundaram was selected to direct the film but later he was replaced by Suresh Krissna. The film was launched in 2006 and the function was attended by director Shankar, Vijay, Asin, Rajathi Ammal, wife of Chief Minister M Karunanidhi, Rama Narayanan, Director Association chief S A Chandrasekhar and the honchos of Theatres Owners Association among others took part in the celebrations. Archana, who was part of the films directed by Balu Mahendra agreed to play the mother of Dhanush. To portray his role in the film, Dhanush grew his hair out. The film was titled as "Parattai" with prefix Azhagu Sundaram being his character name in the film. Incidentally, Parattai was the famous character played by Rajinikanth in the film 16 Vayathinile (1977).

Soundtrack 
The film score and the soundtrack were composed by Gurukiran. The soundtrack, released on 5 February 2007, features 6 tracks with lyrics written by P. Vijay, Na. Muthukumar and Viveka.

Yuvan Shankar Raja who was initially agreed to compose the music later backed out owing to commitments. He was later replaced by Gurukiran who composed the original film making his debut in Tamil films. Gurukiran retained the soundtrack of Jogi for this version too.

Reception 
Sify wrote, "Parattai Engira Azhagu Sundaram is a steamy sob story harping on mother-son sentiments’ reminding you of 60's tearjerker's laced with lot of violence and Rajnikanth's favourite director Suresh Krishna's presentation and direction is old fashioned, to put it mildly". Behindwoods said, "Mistakes do happen, let them not be repeated. Fate does not play havoc in anyone’s life as shown in Parattai. Everyone controls his own destiny. So, Dhanush better control his own and choose stories carefully. Otherwise he will become the ‘Polladavan’ of the industry". Sriram Iyer of Rediff wrote, "Director Suresh Krishna has relied on melodrama to make up for the story's deficiencies. Poor performances add to the film's low points".

References

External links 

2000s crime drama films
2000s Tamil-language films
2007 films
Films about organised crime in India
Films directed by Suresh Krissna
Films scored by Gurukiran
Indian crime action films
Indian gangster films
Tamil remakes of Kannada films